Zöschingen is a municipality  in the district of Dillingen in Bavaria in Germany.

Mayors
Since 2014 Tobias Steinwinter (Gemeinschaftsliste) is the mayor. The predecessor was Norbert Schön.

References

Dillingen (district)